Mark Daly (born 12 March 1973) is an Irish Fianna Fáil politician who has served as Leas-Chathaoirleach of Seanad Éireann since December 2022. He previously served as Cathaoirleach of Seanad Éireann from June 2020 to December 2022. He has served as a Senator for the Administrative Panel since July 2007.

Early and personal life
Daly was born in Cork in 1973, but is a native of Kenmare, County Kerry. He is a qualified estate agent. He finished third on the RTÉ reality television show Treasure Island in 2002.

Political career
He previously worked as an assistant to MEP Brian Crowley. Daly was previously Seanad Spokesperson for Fianna Fáil on Overseas Development and Deputy Spokesperson on Innovation, Office of Public Works and Youth Affairs. He is also a member of the Joint Oireachtas Foreign Affairs Committee and a member of the Foreign affairs Committee on human rights. He is the current Spokesperson for Irish Overseas and Diaspora. He is a member of the All-Party Decade of Commemorations working group.

On 30 May 2010, he was one of three Irish politicians who were prevented by authorities from leaving Cyprus to join an international flotilla carrying aid to the besieged Gaza Strip.

In 2011, he was appointed Fianna Fáil Seanad Spokesperson on Communications, Energy and Natural Resources.

Daly succeeded in having the Seanad recalled from its 2013 summer recess in an unprecedented debate to discuss an EU directive transposed into Irish law by Minister for Health James Reilly without debate in the Dáil or Seanad. The vote was tied and won by the Government through the casting vote of the Cathaoirleach of the Seanad. Alex White, Minister of State at the Department of Health, told the chamber that no case had been made of any strength why the legislation should be annulled. The government dismissed the recall as a "stunt".

References

External links

Mark Daly's page on the Fianna Fáil website

1973 births
Living people
Alumni of the University of Greenwich
Fianna Fáil senators
Harvard Kennedy School alumni
Members of the 23rd Seanad
Members of the 24th Seanad
Members of the 25th Seanad
Members of the 26th Seanad
Participants in Irish reality television series
Politicians from County Kerry
Cathaoirligh of Seanad Éireann